Fragile site, 5-azacytidine type, common, fra(1)(q12) is a protein that in humans is encoded by the FRA1J gene.

References 

Human proteins